DXAB (1296 AM) Radyo Patrol was a radio station owned and operated by ABS-CBN Corporation. The station's studio was located at the ABS-CBN Broadcast Center, Shrine Hills, Matina, Davao City, and its transmitter was located at Km 4 McArthur Highway, Matina, Davao City.

On May 5, 2020, the station, along with the other My Only Radio stations, went off the air due to the cease and desist order of the National Telecommunications Commission. On May 8, 2020, most of its programming resumed via online feed under its name. On August 28, 2020, it signed off for the last time.

References

External links 
 

Radio stations in Davao City
News and talk radio stations in the Philippines
Radio stations established in 1964
Radyo Patrol stations
Radio stations disestablished in 2020
Defunct radio stations in the Philippines